Elachista rutjani is a moth in the family Elachistidae. It was described by Lauri Kaila in 2011. It is found in Russia, where it has been recorded from the southern Ural and the Lower Volga region. It is also found in Ukraine. The habitat consists of limestone steppes.

The wingspan is 7.5–9 mm. The forewings and hindwings vary from white to yellow, irrorated (sprinkled) with brownish-tipped scales.

References

Moths described in 2011
rutjani
Moths of Europe